Laert Ndoni (born 11 April 1984 in Lushnjë) is an Albanian footballer who currently plays as a midfielder for KS Lushnja in the Albanian First Division.

References

External links
 Profile - FSHF

1984 births
Living people
Sportspeople from Lushnjë
Albanian footballers
Association football midfielders
KS Lushnja players
KS Shkumbini Peqin players
FC Kamza players
Besa Kavajë players
KF Skrapari players
Kategoria Superiore players
Kategoria e Parë players